Cunégonde or Cunegonde can refer to:
a character in the novel Candide
a character in the operetta Candide
Little Burgundy, the current name for Sainte-Cunégonde, a former municipality in part of present-day Montreal   
Cunigunde of Luxembourg
Kinga of Poland
Kunigunde,  a European female name of German origin.